Megapallifera mutabilis, common name the changeable mantleslug, is a species of air-breathing land slug, a terrestrial pulmonate gastropod mollusk in the family Philomycidae. It eats primarily algae, and lives in live trees such as American beech. The species is native to eastern North America.

References

Philomycidae
Gastropods described in 1951
Molluscs of North America